How Crazy Your Love is the fifth studio album by Japanese singer-songwriter Yui, released on November 2, 2011. It became her fifth consecutive album to top the Oricon charts, becoming the first female artist to do so since Utada Hikaru's Utada Hikaru Single Collection Vol. 2, which was released in 2010.

Background and writing
The title signifies "how much is your affection" as Yui revealed during an interview by Oricon. Summarizing, she stated it was an album which asked the listener about his or her emotions.

Using this idea, she placed "Green a.Live" at the end of the album since it was a song which contained many questions on feelings. To place the other songs, she wanted the order to have variation; for example, she would put rock songs then acoustic songs.

In writing the song, she decided to attempt different styles of music. She especially singled out "Separation" for its funky rhythm, or an attempt at thrilling the audience in "Lock On". Not only trying complicated rhythms, she also recalled the simple triple used in "Cooking", a rhythm which she had always wanted to try out.  Along the same lines, Yui wanted this album to represent trying something new, and that it also represents her desire to have the freedom to make music as she desires.

Track listing
 Regular Edition

Charts

References

2011 albums
Yui (singer) albums
Gr8! Records albums
Japanese-language albums